Concarneau Cornouaille Agglomération is the communauté d'agglomération, an intercommunal structure, centred on the town of Concarneau. It is located in the Finistère department, in the Brittany region, northwestern France. Created in 2012, its seat is in Concarneau. Its area is 371.3 km2. Its population was 50,975 in 2019, of which 19,816 in Concarneau proper.

Composition
The communauté d'agglomération consists of the following 9 communes:

Concarneau
Elliant
Melgven
Névez
Pont-Aven
Rosporden
Saint-Yvi
Tourch
Trégunc

References

Concarneau
Concarneau